Ville-en-Tardenois is a commune in the Marne department in north-eastern France.

It is named for the Tardenois region.

See also
Communes of the Marne department
Montagne de Reims Regional Natural Park

References

Villeentardenois